Mitchell River National Park is the name of two national parks in Australia:

 Mitchell River National Park (Western Australia) in the Kimberley region of Western Australia
 Mitchell River National Park (Victoria) in Gippsland in Victoria

See also 
 Mitchell River (disambiguation)